, is a Japanese jazz saxophonist and flautist. She grew up in Tokyo.

Biography
Kobayashi was born October 20, 1981 in Kanagawa Prefecture. Her father was a photographer and her mother, a piano teacher. Beginning at a very young age, Kobayashi learned to play the piano. When she was 13 years old she joined a brass band and started to play the flute. Four years later she stopped playing in the band, instead choosing to start a relationship with the saxophone. After that she turned to jazz.

After four years, having learned from Bob Zangu how to play the saxophone in a jazz setting, she entered the Senzoku College of Music. After graduating, she got a contract with the label Victor Entertainment and her first album, Solar, appeared.

Albums
 Solar, Kaori's Collection (2005)
 Fine (2006)
 Glow (2007)
 Shiny (2008)
 The Golden Best (2009)
 Luv Sax (2009)
 Precious (2011)
 Seventh (2012)
 Urban Stream (2013)
 Spirit (2014)
 STORY: 10th Anniversary (2015)
 Melody (2016)
 Be myself! (2018)

References

External links
 Official website 
 Interview on Kochipan  (French)

Japanese jazz saxophonists
Women saxophonists
Japanese jazz flautists
Living people
1981 births
21st-century saxophonists
21st-century Japanese musicians